Little Red Riding Hood is a 2022 Russian children's fantasy film directed by Lina Arifulina, Aleksandr Barshak and Artyom Aksenenko. It was theatrically released on September 22, 2022.

Plot 
The action of the fantastic tape begins long before the birth of Little Red Riding Hood and tells bout her origin. A hundred years ago, two warring clans concluded a truce: the Wolfboys, the defenders of the fairy-tale city, agreed with the hawks that they would not leave the territory of the forest. For some time, the agreement was respected, but then werewolves began to be increasingly noticed near the settlement. The main Wolfboy and the father of Little Red Riding Hood decides to fight back dangerous predators, but dies in an unequal battle. The city is left defenseless and is at the mercy of Westar, the leader of a pack of wolves. Little Red Riding Hood's mother and her grandmother manage to get out of the panic-stricken city and reach a secluded place. After some time, a wonderful child is born who knows nothing about either his father or his destiny.

Only at the age of twelve, Little Red Riding Hood learns the secret of her kind - her mother and grandmother finally tell her about Wolfboy, whose daughter she is, and about what happened to him. Now the girl, in whom the hot blood of her brave parent flows, has to do what her father failed to do - to stop dangerous predators that threaten people again.

Cast

Music
The title musical theme of the picture was the composition of the group "Bi-2" and "Wolves" (by the way, the musicians will also appear in the frame). Also, Anet Sai's track "Do not Let Go" will sound in the tape.

References

External links 
 

2022 films
2020s Russian-language films
2020s children's fantasy films
Films based on Little Red Riding Hood
Russian children's fantasy films
Russian children's adventure films
Russian fantasy adventure films
Russian fantasy comedy films